Synemon brontias is a moth in the Castniidae family. It is found in Australia, including Western Australia.

References

Moths described in 1891
Castniidae